1916 Boreas, provisional designation , is an eccentric, stony asteroid and near-Earth object of the Amor group, approximately 3 kilometers in diameter. After its discovery in 1953, it became a lost asteroid until 1974. It was named after Boreas from Greek mythology.

Discovery 

Boreas was discovered on 1 September 1953, by Belgian astronomer Sylvain Arend at the Royal Observatory of Belgium in Uccle. The asteroid was observed for 2 months and then with time became a lost asteroid. It was recovered in 1974, by Richard Eugene McCrosky, G. Schwartz and JH Bulger based on a predicted position by Brian G. Marsden.

Orbit and classification 

Boreas orbits the Sun at a distance of 1.3–3.3 AU once every 3 years and 5 months (1,251 days). Its orbit has an eccentricity of 0.45 and an inclination of 13° with respect to the ecliptic.

Its observation arc begins with it official discovery observation at Uccle in 1953.

Physical characteristics 

On the Tholen and SMASS taxonomic scheme, Boreas is classified as a common S-type asteroid with a stony composition. It has also been characterized as a Sw-subtype.

Several rotational lightcurves gave a rotation period between 3.4741 and 3.49 hours with a brightness variation between 0.25 and 0.35 magnitude.

In 1994, astronomer Tom Gehrels estimated Boreas to measure 3.5 kilometers in diameter, based on an assumed albedo of 0.15. The Collaborative Asteroid Lightcurve Link assumes a standard albedo for stony asteroids of 0.20 and calculates a diameter of 3.07 kilometers with an absolute magnitude of 14.93.

Naming 

This minor planet is named after the Greek god of the north wind, Boreas, as the asteroid was discovered moving rapidly northward after passing the ascending node of its orbit. The official naming citation was published by the Minor Planet Center on 8 April 1982.

Notes

References

External links 
 Asteroid Lightcurve Database (LCDB), query form (info )
 Dictionary of Minor Planet Names, Google books
 Asteroids and comets rotation curves, CdR – Observatoire de Genève, Raoul Behrend
 
 
 

001916
Discoveries by Sylvain Arend
Named minor planets
001916
001916
19530901